The  is a commuter rail line in the Osaka-Kobe-Kyoto Metropolitan Area owned and operated by West Japan Railway Company (JR West). The name applies to the section of the Tōkaidō Main Line between Kyōto Station and Ōsaka Station.

The Kyōto Line operates in combination with the Biwako Line and the JR Kobe Line, and offers through service trains to the Kosei Line and the JR Takarazuka Line.

Basic data

Operators, distances: 42.8 km / 26.6 mi.
West Japan Railway Company (Category-1, services and tracks)
Japan Freight Railway Company (Category-2, services)
Track: Entire line quadruple-tracked
Railway signalling: Automatic
Maximum speed:
outer tracks: 130 km/h
inner tracks: 120 km/h
CTC centers: Ōsaka Operation Control Center
CTC system:  JR Kyoto-Kobe traffic control system (ja:運行管理システム(JR西日本))

Services
Commuter trains are classified in three types:
 
Continuing service from the Biwako Line and the Kosei Line. Trains stop at Kyōto, Takatsuki, Shin-Ōsaka, and Ōsaka. Trains continue from Ōsaka on the JR Kōbe Line to Himeji and beyond. 223 series and 225 series EMUs are used. Daytime trains depart every 15 minutes and take 28 minutes from Kyōto to Ōsaka and vice versa.
 
Continuing service from the Biwako Line and the Kosei Line. Trains stop at Kyōto, Nagaokakyō, Takatsuki, Ibaraki, Shin-Ōsaka, and Ōsaka. After the morning, trains also stop at all other stations between Kyōto and Takatsuki and occasionally called local trains on this section. Trains continue from Osaka on the JR Kōbe Line to Himeji and beyond. 225 series, 223 series, 221 series EMUs are used.
 
Service from Kyōto to Nishi-Akashi on the JR Kōbe Line, and from Takatsuki to Shin-Sanda on the JR Takarazuka Line. Trains stop at all stations. 321 series EMUs and 207 series EMUs are used.

In addition to the three types of commuter trains, long-distance limited express trains connecting the Kyoto-Osaka region with Kansai International Airport (Haruka services), Hokuriku region (Thunderbird services) and other areas also frequently operate on the line. Freight trains also operate on the line except for the section near Osaka Station where freight trains use separate freight lines.

Stations
Legend:

 ● : All trains stop
 | : All trains pass
 ▲ : Trains only after morning rush stop

Local trains stop at all stations. Rapid trains in the morning skip some stops between Kyoto and Takatsuki.

Closed station
From September 5, 1876 to the opening of Kyoto Station on February 6, 1877,  was the station for the city of Kyoto. The temporary station was located at 40 chains (0.80 km) west of Kyoto Station construction site, or 3 miles and 47 chains (5.77 km) away from Mukōmachi Station.

Rolling stock

Local

 207 series (from 1991, through service with Fukuchiyama Line)
 321 series (from 2005, through service with Fukuchiyama Line)

Special Rapid and Rapid
 221 series (from 1989, through service with Kosei and Biwako Lines, until 2023)
 223-1000/2000/6000 series (from 1995, through service with Kosei and Biwako Lines, until 2030)
 225-0/100 series (from 2010, through service with Kosei and Biwako Lines, until 2030)

Limited express
 271 series (Haruka service, from Spring 2020)
 281 series (Haruka service, from 1994)
 283 series (Kuroshio service, from 1997)
 285 series (Sunrise Izumo/Sunrise Seto service, from July 1998)
 287 series (Kuroshio service, from 2012)
 289 series (Kuroshio service, from October 2015)
 681 series (Thunderbird and Biwako Express service, from 1992)
 683 series (Thunderbird and Biwako Express service, from 2001)
 KiHa 189 series (Biwako Express service, from March 2014)
 KiHa 85 series (JR Central) (Hida service)
 HOT7000 series (Chizu Express) (Super Hakuto service, from 1994, through service with Chizu Line)

Former
 103 series (until August 1, 2005) 
 113 series (until October 16, 2004)
 117 series (from 1980 until May 10, 1999)
 201 series (from 1983 until 2007)
 205-0 series (from 1986 until 2006, from 2011 until March 2013)
 381 series (Limited Express Kuroshio service, until October 2015)
 485 series (Limited Express Raichō until March 2011)
 583 series (Express Kitaguni until January 2013)
 KiHa 181 series (Limited Express Hakuto from 1994 until 1997)
 383 series (JR Central) (Limited Express Shinano until 26 March 2016)

History

The line now called the JR Kyoto Line opened in 1876, only four years after the opening of the first railway in Japan. On 26 July 1876, the Japanese Government Railways opened the section between Ōsaka and Mukōmachi with an intermediate station at Takatsuki. On 9 August 1876, Yamazaki Station, Ibaraki Station and Suita Station opened. Kyoto Station opened on 6 February 1877.

On 1 June 1949, operation of the line was taken over by Japanese National Railways (JNR).
 1 October 1964 – Shin-Ōsaka Station opens with a Tōkaidō Shinkansen connection
 1 October 1970 – Operation of Special Rapid Service starts
 1 April 1987 – JR West becomes the operator of the line following privatization of JNR
 13 March 1988 – JR West starts the use of the line name JR Kyōto Line

References

External links

Rail transport in Kyoto Prefecture
Rail transport in Osaka Prefecture
Kyōto Line
Kyōto Line
1067 mm gauge railways in Japan